Puebloviejo is a town and municipality of the Colombian Department of Magdalena. It was founded in 1526 by friar Tomas Ortíz. It was erected a municipality on May 3, 1929. The town lies on a natural thin division between the Ciénaga Grande de Santa Marta marshes and the Caribbean sea.

Politics

Administrative divisions
Corregimientos:
 Bocas de Aracataca
 Islas del Rosario
 Palmira
 Tasajera
 Palos
 Prietos

References

External links
  Pueblo Viajo official website
  Gobernacion del Maagdalena - Municipios: Puebloviejo

Municipalities of Magdalena Department
Populated places established in 1526